Leioheterodon is a genus of  pseudoxyrhophiid snakes found only on the island of Madagascar. Three species are currently recognized. Common names include Malagasy hognose snakes, Malagasy brown snakes and Malagasy menarana snakes.

Species 
 Speckled Hognose Snake, Leioheterodon geayi (Mocquard, 1905)
 Malagasy Giant Hognose Snake, Leioheterodon madagascariensis (Duméril & Bibron, 1854)
 Blonde Hognose Snake, Leioheterodon modestus (Günther, 1863)

References

Further reading

External links
 

Pseudoxyrhophiidae
Reptiles of Madagascar
Snake genera
Taxa named by André Marie Constant Duméril
Taxa named by Gabriel Bibron